The ATHENS Programme (for Advanced Technology Higher Education Network/Socrates) is a 1-week exchange session, held twice a year (in March   and in November), by a network of European higher education institutions (universities, universities of technology, Grandes Ecoles...).

The programme is coordinated by ParisTech.

History 
Created in 1996, it was initially supported by the European Union through the Socrates programme (from 1997 to 2001). It is now self-funded by the member institutions.

It is a merger of  the 'Semaine Européenne' ('European Week') held by ParisTech from 1992 to 1999, and  the Leuven Network ERASMUS Programme held by European institutions from 1990 to 1997.

Courses 
The courses proposed during sessions cover not only the spectrum of the members' fields, but also an opening on arts and humanities.

Activities 
During the week, the host university is supposed to organize activities for the foreign students in the city, to help them discover another culture. Most often, it will consist in a tour of the city a 5-day course on a specific subject and some nights with the local students.

Members 
AUTh Thessaloniki
BME Budapest
TU Delft
KU Leuven
UCLouvain
IST Lisbon
UP Madrid
Politecnico di Milano
TU Munich
CTU Prague
KTH Stockholm
NTNU Trondheim
TU Wien
Warsaw University of Technology
ITU Istanbul
ParisTech:
Chimie ParisTech (ENSCP)
Institut d'Optique Graduate School (IOGS)
AgroParisTech
Ecole Nationale des Ponts et Chaussées (ENPC)
Ecole des ingenieurs de la Ville de Paris (EIVP)
Ecole Nationale de la Statistique et de l'Administration Economique (ENSAE)
Ecole Nationale Superieure des Arts et Métiers (ENSAM)
Ecole Nationale Superieure des Mines de Paris (ENSMP)
Télécom ParisTech
Ecole Nationale Superieure de Techniques Avancées (ENSTA)
École supérieure de physique et de chimie industrielles de la ville de Paris (ESPCI)

Note: Not all members participate in both sessions.

Notes

External links 
The ATHENS Programme website: link ATHENS Programme

Universities and colleges in France
Educational institutions established in 1996
1996 establishments in France